Metaxyphloeus is a genus of beetles in the family Laemophloeidae. It belongs to a small group of rostrate laemophloeid genera endemic to the New World. Members of Metaxyphloeus range from southern Texas south to Bolivia. Related rostrate genera are Rhinomalus and Rhinophloeus. Adults are moderate-sized laemophloeids (~2 mm) characterized by their prolonged heads, open procoxal cavities, an acuminate intercoxal process on the first visible abdominal ventrite, antennal club of six antennomeres, and male genitalia lacking a dorsal piece of the tegmen. Metaxyphloeus adults are dark brown or black, shining, with or without dorsal pubescence, and with one or two pairs of pale elytral maculae. Their biology and immature stages are unknown. Adults may be attracted to light in forest habitats. The function of the rostrum is unknown.

The five included species are:

 Metaxyphloeus germaini (Grouvelle)
 Metaxyphloeus signatus (Sharp)
 Metaxyphloeus texanus (Schaeffer)
 Metaxyphloeus vicinus (Grouvelle)
 Metaxyphloeus zeus Thomas

References

External links
 iNaturalist

Laemophloeidae